David Lefèvre (born May 17, 1980), known as The Swamp Killer (French: Le Tueur des Marais), is a French serial killer. 

On August 8, 1999, Lefèvre killed a homeless man during an armed robbery. He spent more than three years in prison before being released in November 2002. Since this first crime, Lefèvre has multiplied his stays in prison; between August 2003 and January 2004 for vehicle theft, then from 2004 to 2008 for drug trafficking.

Released in 2008, Lefèvre settled in Amiens, then made many friends, including two young men whom he briefly killed in January and September 2011. Charged in September, Lefèvre was placed in preventive detention in December 2011.

Lefèvre was sentenced on November 15, 2013, to life imprisonment with 22 years preventative detention.

Biography

Early life 
David Lefèvre was born on May 17, 1980 in Reims (Marne). He comes from a family of six children and grew up in a shaky social environment, with unloving parents who subjected him to physical and sexual violence; he will later describe them as “Cas-socials”.

In 1988, at the age of 8, Lefèvre was placed in a foster family with his brothers and sisters. Lefèvre is a reserved and evasive child on certain points, in particular when one mentions his parents and his first years spent with them.

The 1980s and 1990s were a period of absenteeism for Lefèvre. Although he has never seen his parents again, Lefèvre constructs a whole persecuted and unhealthy personality for himself, without noticing any difference with reality. Otherwise, Lefèvre decides to build a swing for his brothers and sisters in order to bring comfort to a sibling also marked by disenchantment (one of his sisters will testify to this later).

The period 1998-1999 is a rise in crime for Lefèvre who, having reached his majority, switches to delinquency, with the help of a minor accomplice. It is in this context that Lefèvre and his accomplice buy a revolver in order to commit several robberies and collect stolen money.

Armed robbery and first murder 
On August 5, 1999, the 19-year-old Lefèvre and his accomplice commit their first successful theft, shoplifting from a store in Laon. Believing that they could reoffend with complete impunity, the pair planned to continue their illicit practice.

On August 8, 1999, Lefèvre and the accomplice were preparing for another theft when they came across a homeless man. Deciding that they would rob him instead, the pair attacked him, but during the struggle, Lefèvre shot and killed the man and his pet rat with a pistol. Shortly afterwards, they both fled, but not until a few passers-by saw them and later denounced their identities to the police.

Thinking that they had successfully evaded capture, Lefèvre and his accomplice began planning their next hit. In the meantime, authorities searched in vain for the two youths with no previous convictions. The break came a few days later, when new testimony brought the police officers to the thieves' residences.

Arrest and imprisonment 
On August 14, 1999, Lefèvre and his accomplice were arrested and imprisoned in Laon prison for two armed robberies, one of which was preceded by intentional homicide. At this stage of the investigation, the police are trying to verify if the murder of the SDF was premeditated. The latter then try to discover the personality of Lefèvre and his accomplice, in order to see if they are responsible for their actions and to find the motive for the two misdeeds, because of their young ages.

In September 1999, Léfèvre and his accomplice were examined by psychiatric experts, with a view to an evaluation of their mental states. The defense of the defendants advances the fact of having killed the SDF in a "state of insanity" because, although having used a pistol, the lawyers demonstrate that Lefèvre is his accomplice had only used it to ensure their second flight at gunpoint. Following the defense's request, the psychiatric experts did not discover any mental dysfunction in David Lefèvre and his accomplice, due to the use of their weapons, which they used to ensure their escape.

June 3, 2002, David Lefèvre and his accomplice were tried by the Assize Court for minors in Douai for two armed robberies, one of which resulted in death without intention of causing death. Aged 22, Lefèvre acknowledges the facts, but without admitting any valid motive for the murder of the homeless who, according to him, was in “the wrong place and at the wrong time”.

On June 6, 2002, Lefèvre was sentenced to 5 years in prison, including a six-month suspended sentence accompanied by a three-year probation; which condemns him to a sentence of 4 and a half years in prison. The murder of the SDF allowed the defendants to demonstrate that there was no premeditation at the time of the second armed robbery, and that the latter had gone wrong.

Lefèvre was released on November 2, 2002, after three years and three months in prison.

Car theft 
Following his release, Lefèvre returned to live with his host family and reunited with his brothers and sisters.

In the spring of 2003, Lefèvre was arrested after stealing a car. Indicted for the theft of a vehicle, Lefèvre was released under judicial supervision, pending trial for this offence.

On August 21, 2003, Lefèvre was tried before the criminal court of Douai for the theft of a vehicle. He was sentenced to a fine, but his six-month suspended sentence was added to his sentence (which had been pronounced a year earlier), he received a six-month prison sentence.

Lefèvre was released in January 2004, after four and a half months of detention. Following release, Lefèvre becomes a dealer and starts selling Cocaine.

Drug trafficking 
In 2004, Lefèvre was again arrested by the police for illegal possession of cocaine. Lefèvre is indicted for drug trafficking and is placed in pre-trial detention.

Lefèvre was tried in 2006 before the Criminal Court of Péronne for his crimes; vehicle theft and drug trafficking. At the end of his correctional judgment, Lefèvre was sentenced to 5 years in prison. Following his conviction, Lefèvre thus spent four additional years in prison, before being granted conditional release. After nearly eight years in prison, Lefèvre was released in 2008.

During the period 2008-2009, Lefèvre arrived in Amiens and met Julien Guérin, 20, a former child of the DDASS, forced to undergo drug treatment to cure alcoholism. The two young men are known to attend many parties. Lefèvre then meets Sylvie, a young woman also described as "fragile". With Julien, all three form a great friendship which results in more parties and evenings in nightclubs.

In 2010, however, Lefèvre seems affected to see Julien Guérin get into a relationship with Alice Caron, 17, then start a family in the space of a few months.

New murders

Julien Guérin 
On January 13, 2011, after a long party, Lefèvre took Guérin in his car, ostensibly to drive to Belgium to buy cigarettes. However, he instead drove to the swamp near Camon, where he got him out and hit him with a baseball bat. This caused Julien to fall into the swamp, and drown less than a minute later. Lefèvre quickly left the scene and returned home, thinking at the time that his friend was still alive. In order not to arouse suspicion, he disposed of the bat. A day later, he went to Guérin's girlfriend and told her that he had dropped him off in Amiens. A complaint was filed for Guérin's disappearance the next day, but Lefèvre, knowing how interrogators operated, managed to convince the investigators that he had simply acted a messenger for Julien. Lacking evidence to detain him, he was released without charge.

A week into Guérin's sudden disappearance, his younger sister attempted to file a missing persons report, but as he was of legal age, the police refused to start an investigation. In the meantime, Lefèvre continued cooperating with them, as he was never considered a suspect in the case.

On February 14, 2011, Guérin's lifeless body was in the middle of the Avre by a municipal employee who was cleaning the riverbanks. The corpse was brought to the coroner, but as the body was determined to have been in the river for more than a month, the autopsy took considerably longer than usual. A month later, the cause of death was officially designated as accidental, with coroners rationalizing that Guérin's addiction to buprenorphine and methadone, and possibly consumption of strong vodka, resulted in his death.

Around this time, Lefèvre bought himself a new gun. In August of that year, he learned that his mutual friend, Sylvie, had begun a relationship with a 24-year-old man named Alexandre Michaud. Agitated and feeling 'left on the sidelines' by a friend yet again, he began to harbor resentment towards Michaud.

Alexandre Michaud 
On the evening of September 4, 2011, following an argument with Sylvie, Alexandre hit the wall violently and injured his wrist. Having no means of transportation, Sylvie called David to come pick him up. He arrived at the couple's house, took Michaud and drove to the hospital, where he left the doctors to take care of his injured acquaintance. However, when he came back to pick him up, he drove to the Camon swamp, where he shot Michaud with his gun twice, once in the back and once in the head. The man fell into the swamp, managing to grab onto a rowboat, but succumbed to his injuries. Having killed his victim, Lefèvre drove home.

Two days later, Sylvie went to the police station to report her boyfriend's disappearance, recounting how Alexandre disappeared after he was driven by her friend David to the hospital. Following her testimony, a search and rescue operation was launched to find the young man. A few days later, Michaud was found in the marshes and identified by a distinctive jersey that he wore. Feeling that the crime might be connected to that the death of Julien Guérin, who had been found in similar circumstances and also had connections to Lefèvre, the gendarmes considered that the two cases might be connected.

On September 14, 2011, Lefèvre was taken into custody. During his hearing, the 31-year-old man resists the gendarmes who question him. Lefèvre gives his explanations, but the gendarmes, having discovered the criminal's past, extend his custody. However, Lefèvre is indicted for the murder of Alexandre Michaud, but leaves the police station free; lack of evidence and incriminating evidence. Although Lefèvre went free, the investigators decided to place him on wiretapping his phone tapping in order to monitor him and collect more evidence. 

In November 2011, during a phone call to Sylvie, David Lefèvre brags, telling her that he has already killed three times. The call is intercepted by the investigators who, as a result, are now convinced of Lefèvre's guilt. They nevertheless decide to prepare the future police custody of the suspect, in order to find elements for the latter to confess to the crimes attributed to him.

Arrest and confession 
On December 13, 2011, Lefèvre was again placed in police custody. After a prolonged interrogation, he still refused to answer any of the gendarmes' questions, whereupon he was taken to Camon for further questioning about the murder of Michaud but, not knowing that Julien's body had been deflected by the current of the marsh, Lefèvre reveals that Julien Guérin had died in the same place, indirectly denouncing the police. Following his "accidental confession", Lefèvre is again indicted for the assassination of Alexandre Michaud and also indicted for the assassination of Julien Guérin. Lefèvre is placed in pre-trial detention and is thus nicknamed The Swamp Killer (French: Le Tueur des Marais).

On March 20, 2012, after denying the accusations for some time, Lefèvre wrote a letter to the prosecutor, in which he gave a detailed confession to both murders and apologised to their families. Following the receipt of this letter, the judge ordered that he a reconstruction of the crime scenes be conducted. 

On September 25, 2012, Lefèvre was brought to Camon and retold how he committed the crimes, in the presence of Guérin and Michaud's family members. After explaining the murders, he was returned to prison, without providing a motive for either killing.

In early 2013, he was transferred to the cour d'assises in Somme, where he was charged with the premeditated murder of Alexandre Michaud and the second-degree murder of Julien Guérin, for which he faced life imprisonment.

Trial and sentencing 
On November 12, 2013, Lefèvre's trial began. Silent and inert for most of the proceedings, he proclaimed that he welcomed his condemnation and wished that his relatives and friends do not support him. Three days later, he was sentenced to life imprisonment with 22 years preventative detention, making him unable to apply for parole until December 2033. His crime spree preceded that of another serial killer, Yoni Palmier, by only two months.

See also
 Serial murders in Essonne
 List of French serial killers

References

External links

Documentary 
 "David Lefèvre, the Swamp Killer", released on February 3, 2020 on Faites entrer l'accusé and presented by Frédérique Lantieri on France 2

1980 births
20th-century French criminals
21st-century French criminals
French male criminals
French people convicted of murder
French prisoners and detainees
French serial killers
Living people
Male serial killers
People convicted of murder by France
People convicted of theft
People from Reims
Prisoners and detainees of France
Prisoners sentenced to life imprisonment by France
Somme (department)